Michel Palmié (born December 1, 1951 in Béziers, France) is a retired French international rugby union player. He played as a Lock for AS Béziers and earned his first cap with the French national team on 21 June 1975 against South Africa.

Honours 
 Selected to represent France, 1975–1978
 Grand Slam : 1977
 French rugby champion, 1974, 1975, 1977, 1978, 1980, 1981 with AS Béziers
 Challenge Yves du Manoir 1975 and 1977 with AS Béziers
 French championship finalist 1976 with AS Béziers

External links
 http://www.espnscrum.com/statsguru/rugby/player/8400.html
  The top 10 frightening Frenchmen

French rugby union players
Living people
France international rugby union players
1951 births
Rugby union locks
Sportspeople from Béziers
AS Béziers Hérault players